Spiti Valley is a desert mountain valley high in the Himalayas.

Spiti may also refer to:

Lahaul and Spiti district, a district in the state of Himachal Pradesh in India
Spiti Horse, a horse breed from Himachal Pradesh
Spiti language, spoken in Spiti, Himachal Pradesh, India
Spiti River, in the Spiti Valley, Himachal Pradesh

he:ספיטי